William Kelso Journey (July 19, 1915 - 2002) was an American politician from Clinton, Missouri, who served in the Missouri Senate and the Missouri House of Representatives. He served as prosecuting attorney of Henry County, Missouri. During World War II, Journey served in the U.S. Navy from 1942 until 1946.

References

1915 births
2002 deaths
Democratic Party members of the Missouri House of Representatives
Democratic Party Missouri state senators
20th-century American politicians
People from Clinton, Missouri